Sabina Citron (born 1928) is a Holocaust survivor. She is a founder and spokesperson of the Canadian Holocaust Remembrance Association, charged a Nazi propagandist under the Canadian Criminal Code with spreading false news in relation to the Holocaust, and prevailed in a civil lawsuit for libel against Hungarian war criminal Imre Finta. She authored The Indictment.

Early life
Citron was born in Łódź, Poland. She performed forced labour in an ammunition factory during World War II.

Later during the Holocaust, she was incarcerated in Auschwitz concentration camp, where her oldest brother died.  Although the rest of Citron's close relatives managed to survive, almost all of her extended family were killed.  She moved to Israel in 1948, later immigrated to Toronto, Canada, and now lives in Jerusalem, Israel.

Later life
Citron became a founder and spokesperson of the Canadian Holocaust Remembrance Association.

In 1983 Citron began a private prosecution under the Canadian Criminal Code against Nazi propagandist Ernst Zündel, a Holocaust denier and pamphleteer, charging him with spreading false news.

The charges were based on two pamphlets he had published. Citron alleged that the publications were "likely to cause mischief to the public interest in social and racial tolerance".  The case was taken over by the Crown Attorney's office, and Zündel was convicted and sentenced to 15 months in jail.

However, on appeal to the Ontario Court of Appeal, the conviction was set aside and a re-trial ordered, due to procedural errors made by the trial judge. Zündel was again convicted at the re-trial and appealed, first to the Ontario Court of Appeal, which dismissed the appeal, and then to the Supreme Court of Canada, which allowed the appeal, overturning the decisions of the courts below.  In its decision, the Supreme Court held that the charge of spreading false news was unconstitutional, because it infringed the guarantee of freedom of expression in the Canadian Charter of Rights and Freedoms.

Citron also prevailed in a civil lawsuit for libel against Imre Finta, after he accused her of being a liar for saying that he had committed war crimes.

Citron is the author of The Indictment: The Arab-Israeli Conflict in Historical Perspective (Gefen Publishing House Ltd, 2006).

References

Auschwitz concentration camp survivors
1928 births
Living people
People from Jerusalem
People from Łódź
Polish emigrants to Canada
Polish emigrants to Israel
Canadian non-fiction writers
Writers from Toronto
Jewish Canadian writers
Holocaust denial in Canada
Canadian women non-fiction writers
Jewish women writers